Aggressive digital papillary adenocarcinoma is a cutaneous condition characterized by an aggressive malignancy involving the digit between the nailbed and the distal interphalangeal  joint spaces.

See also 
 Mucinous carcinoma
 List of cutaneous conditions

References 

Epidermal nevi, neoplasms, and cysts